Robin Tyler (born Arlene Chernick, April 8, 1942) is the first  lesbian or gay comic to come out on national television, a feminist and pioneer in the grassroots struggle for LGBTQ civil rights and marriage equality in the U.S., and a producer. She emceed and produced the main stage at three marches on Washington for LGBTQ rights, including the historic first National March On Washington for Lesbian and Gay Rights in 1979. Tyler coined the phrase "We are everywhere" as a rallying cry for the LGBTQ community. This became the powerful signature chant of the 1979 march, appearing on banners and posters. The chant "We are everywhere" has continued as a popular rallying cry for LGBTQ equality.

National marches on Washington for lesbian and gay rights 
Tyler produced and emceed the main stages for three early historic lesbian and gay marches on Washington, and called for the first National March on Washington for Lesbian and Gay Rights in the wake of the murder of Harvey Milk. The march took place on Oct 14, 1979, and brought between 75,000 and 125,00 LGBT people to the Washington Monument grounds.  

At the Second National March on Washington for Lesbian and Gay Rights, in 1987, Tyler, wearing a black tuxedo as she emceed the event, produced "The Wedding" on the main stage of the Washington Mall. During The Wedding hundreds of gay couples participated in a mock marriage ceremony in protest of the fact that LGBT people were not allowed to legally marry. This was the first act of mass civil disobedience made by the LGBT community in support of gay marriage.

Activism 
Tyler and her late wife, Diane Olson, sued the state of California in 2001 for the right to be married, launching a seven-year legal battle for marriage equality in the state. After winning their lawsuit, Tyler and Olson became the first lesbian couple to be married in Los Angeles. The City Council of Los Angeles unanimously voted that their wedding day, June 16, 2008, should be known officially as “Marriage Equality Day."  

In 2000, Tyler organized the national movement to StopDrLaura.com, a campaign against the homophobic propaganda of radio personality Dr. Laura Schlesinger.

In 2003, as the US Supreme Court was hearing the case Lawrence v. Texas, Tyler co-organized national demonstrations across the United States. When the decision from the court came down affirming that sodomy laws were unconstitutional, thousands of LGBTQ rights activists rallied by Tyler came together in celebrations across the country.

Comedy career 
Tyler became the first out lesbian on U.S. national television when she revealed her sexuality on a 1978 Showtime special, The 1st Annual Funny Women’s Show, hosted by Phyllis Diller.  She has released two comedy albums, "Always a Bridesmaid Never A Groom" in 1979, and "Just Kidding" in 1985. In her earlier career she was one half of the lesbian, feminist comedy duo, Harrison and Tyler.

Lesbian music festivals 
Along with the lesbian and gay marches on Washington, Tyler also produced a series of 25 popular women's music and comedy festivals, including the annual West Coast Women's Music and Comedy Festival, which ran from 1980 through 1994. Hers were the first trans-inclusive women's festivals in the country.

References

1942 births
Living people
Lesbian comedians